, real name , is a painter and illustrator born on November 10, 1951, in Haboro, Hokkaidō Prefecture, Japan. He is best known for his watercolor paintings of young girls and children. Ōta has multiple books in print which collect his works, and he has created illustrations for magazines, books, calendars, and posters, and  has had multiple one-man exhibitions.

He currently lives in Izu, Shizuoka Prefecture.

Biography
Ōta was born in Haboro, Hokkaidō Prefecture, Japan on 10 November 1951. He graduated from Hokkaido Bifuka High School. After moving to Tokyo to work as a freelance interior designer, he taught himself to paint and began doing work as an illustrator. In 1981, he won the Best Work Award at the 1st Poetry and Fairy Tale Illustration Contest sponsored by Sanrio. He won the 12th Sanrio Fine Arts Award in 1986.

In 1992, Ōta held his first series of exhibitions at department stores in every major city in Japan. This has become a regular event since then. He held a nationwide exhibit tour at five locations throughout Japan in 1995. Due to over 600,000 people attending the exhibits, the exhibit had to be extended to accommodate the additional attendees.

Ōta established his home page in 2000 for the 20th anniversary of his professional debut. In 2001, he held an exhibit at the Yokohama Sogō Fine Arts Gallery, and in 2002, exhibits were held at the Sakai Takashimaya and Matsuyama Takashimaya department stores.

Works

Book collections
, (1983, Sanrio)
, (1983, Sanrio)
, (1985, Hakusensha)
, (1986, Sanrio)
, (1987, Hakusensha)
, (1988, Sanrio) (1995 reissue, Sanrio)
, (1989, Hakusensha)
, (1989, Sanrio) (1994 reissue, Sanrio)
, (1991, Hakusensha)
, (1991, Sanrio)
, (1991, Pinpoint) (1998 reissue, Sanrio)
, (1992, Hakusensha)
, (1992, Sanrio)
, (1993, Sanrio)
, (1995, Movic)
, (1995, Sanrio)
, (1997, Sanrio)
, (1998, Hakusensha)
, (2004, Aiikusha)

Sources:

CD-ROM collections
 (Macintosh/Windows hybrid, 1995-04-18, Lits Compute)

Awards and recognition
1981 - Best Work Award at the 1st Poetry and Fairy Tale Illustration Contest sponsored by Sanrio
1986 - Winner of the 12th Sanrio Fine Arts Award

Ōta was featured as the cover artist on several issues of Moe, a monthly art and illustration magazine published in Japan by Hakusensha since 1984. 
May 1984, also featured as the illustrator of a serialized fairy tale by Yōko Inoue and the monthly calendar included in the magazine
October 1984
July 1985
January 1986

References

External links
 Official site

1951 births
Japanese contemporary artists
Japanese illustrators
People from Hokkaido
Japanese portrait painters
Living people
Japanese watercolourists